Six of a Kind is an American 1934 pre-Code comedy film directed by Leo McCarey and starring Charles Ruggles, Mary Boland, W.C. Fields, George Burns, and Gracie Allen. It is a whimsical and often absurd road movie about two couples who decide to share their expenses on a trip to Hollywood.  It includes the famous pool playing scene in which Fields explains how he got the name “Honest John”.

Cast
Charles Ruggles (as Charlie Ruggles) - J. Pinkham Whinney
Mary Boland - Flora Whinney
George Burns - George Edward
Gracie Allen - Gracie Devore
W.C. Fields - Sheriff John Hoxley
Alison Skipworth - Mrs. K. Rumford
Phil Tead - Clerk in Newspaper Office

External links
 

1934 comedy films
Films directed by Leo McCarey
1934 films
American black-and-white films
Paramount Pictures films
American comedy road movies
American buddy comedy films
1930s buddy comedy films
1930s American films